The United Nations Fact Finding Mission on the 2014 Israel–Gaza conflict was a United Nations fact-finding mission established by a resolution of the United Nations Human Rights Council (UNHRC) on 23 July 2014 to investigate "all violations of international humanitarian law and international human rights law … in the context of the military operations conducted since 13 June 2014" in the Palestinian territories, particularly the Gaza Strip, during the 2014 Israel–Gaza conflict.

William Schabas was appointed chairman of the three-member committee. Amal Clooney (Lebanon) declined the nomination, and Doudou Diène (Senegal) accepted. Former US judge McGowan Davis joined the committee as the third member. On 2 February 2015, Schabas resigned after it was revealed that he had been a paid consultant for the PLO in 2012.

The final report of the committee was issued on 22 June 2015. The enquiry reported evidence of "serious violations" by both sides. "Israel dismissed the investigation as "politically motivated and morally flawed", while Hamas said it wrongly equated "the victim and executioner"."
The report said 2,251 people, of whom 1,462 were civilians, were killed on the Palestinian side, 67 soldiers and 6 civilians on the Israeli side.

Mission members
On 11 August 2014, the UNHRC established a committee to investigate alleged war crimes during the 2014 Israel–Gaza conflict.

William Schabas, a Canadian professor of international law, was named chairman of the committee.

Amal Clooney, from Lebanon, was selected due to her expertise on international law. She turned down the offer.

Doudou Diène, from Senegal, was selected due to his expertise on racial discrimination.

Mary McGowan Davis, a former New York Supreme Court Judge, was selected on 25 August to be the third member, replacing Clooney.

Mandate of mission and expertise
The investigation was to investigate "purported violations of international humanitarian and human rights laws in the Occupied Palestinian Territory, including East Jerusalem, and particularly in the Gaza Strip since the conflict began on June 13." The committee's report was due in March 2015, but that was deferred to 29 June 2015 after the resignation of Schabas on 2 February 2015. The final report was issued on 22 June 2015.

Schabas controversy 
Schabas's appointment was criticized by Canada's Foreign Minister, John Baird, and the Geneva-based advocacy NGO UN Watch. They noted that Schabas, remarking on what he sees as the political bias in the choice of cases to prosecute made by the International Criminal Court, had asked: "Why are we going after the President of Sudan for Darfur and not the President of Israel for Gaza?" Schabas dismissed Baird's accusation as absurd, noting that he, Schabas, was on the editorial board of the Israel Law Review. In reply to UN Watch's demand he recuse himself on the grounds that he had once criticized Benjamin Netanyahu, Schabas countered:'"Like everybody inside and outside Israel, I disagree with people. Is everyone in Israel who has an opinion about (Benjamin) Netanyahu anti-Israel?".'

Schabas said at the time that there was some merit in comments by critics that Israel was being singled out by the UN for human rights violations, but added that double standards and bias in the UN works both ways, at times to Israel's advantage, citing the fact that the United States almost invariably vetoes resolutions critical of Israel in the Security Council. In short, he concluded:

Let's just say that it's a plausible complaint that maybe Israel has gotten a lot of attention at the Human Rights Council but at the same time it has perhaps had a lot of inattention at the Security Council, so the double standards work in both directions for Israel.

The Israeli government condemned the appointment of Schabas, and Israel's Ambassador to the UN, Ron Prosor, said in an interview "Forming an investigatory committee headed by Schabas is like inviting ISIS to organize religious tolerance week at the UN." Schabas replied that he does not hate Israel and that he will put his prior positions aside, adding: "Even if Spiderman was heading the probe, they [Israel] would've attacked him."

On 2 February 2015, Schabas resigned after an Israeli complaint that he had billed the Palestine Liberation Organization for $US1,300 in 2012 for legal advice he gave them at their request, a precedent which might constitute evidence of a conflict of interest with his position as head of the investigative committee. He stated that he did not want the controversy to overshadow the work of the Gaza inquiry. Prime Minister Benjamin Netanyahu called on the UNHRC to shelve its report: "After the resignation of the committee chairman, who was biased against Israel, the report must not be published". Avidor Liberman attributed Schabas's resignation to Israel's diplomatic work, stating that: "appointing Schabas to investigate Israel was like appointing Cain to investigate Abel." In reply, Schabas said the Prime Minister was entitled to spin the matter any way he liked, and that both he and Avigdor Liberman were "masters of extravagant and ridiculous statements." According to Israeli commentator Gideon Levy, Schabas had fallen victim to investigative character assassination.

In an interview with the BBC Schabas admitted that "there is a distortion in the amount of attention given against Israel, and the number of resolutions directed against Israel" but defended the claim by saying Israel gets a "soft ride in the Security Council hearings."

Reactions

Committee reactions
 Israel – The committee was criticized by Israel as being biased against Israel, and was to referred to by Israel as a Kangaroo Court. Israel's UN Ambassador, Ron Prosor, met with Secretary-General of the United Nations Ban Ki-moon, to request he condemn the appointment Schabas, comparing to the appointment of Schabas to ISIS teaching religious tolerance. Netanyahu spoke out against the fact finding mission, stating that by investigating Israel, the UN is legitimizing what he said was terror groups like Hamas and ISIS.
 United States – US State Department spokeswoman, Marie Harf stated that although there are certain aspects that should be investigated, however criticized the committee by saying "there's a way to investigate things that's not one-sided and biased, and there's a way that we don't support."
 Palestinian Authority – Palestinian Authority Foreign Minister, Riyad al-Maliki, stated that he was confident that the committee would find Israel guilty of war crimes.

Military experts
 Colonel Richard Kemp CBE (ret.), former Commander of British Forces in Afghanistan, stated that the committee's report was flawed and dangerous, "that can only provoke further violence and loss of life". Saying that the report starts with preoccupied attributions for responsibilities for the conflict to Israel's blockade of Gaza and the "protracted occupation of the West Bank and the Gaza Strip", he argues that Israel withdrew from Gaza 10 years ago and imposed a selective blockade only in response to attacks by Hamas (2007) and illegal imports of war materials from Iran. Judge Davis gave no evidence to substantiate the committee's claims of "serious violations of international humanitarian law and international human rights law" by the IDF, Kemp says. He also said that the committee self-admittedly lacked military expertise, and Kemp stated that the report is in deed "characterized by a lack of understanding of warfare", and that it "legitimizes Hamas's rocket and tunnel attacks and even sympathizes with the geographical challenges in launching rockets at Israeli civilians" out of densely populated areas, in violation of international humanitarian law.

See also
 United Nations Fact Finding Mission on the Gaza Conflict
 International Criminal Court investigation in Palestine

References

2014 Israel–Gaza conflict
Israeli–Palestinian conflict and the United Nations
United Nations commissions